The Cymru North is a regional football league in Wales, covering the northern half of the country. It has clubs with semi-professional status and together with the Cymru South, it forms the second tier of the Welsh football league system.

The first year of its operation was 2019–20 with the Football Association of Wales owning and administering the tier 2 leagues for the first time. These changes followed from a review of the Welsh Football Pyramid. Prior to 2019, the equivalent league was the Cymru Alliance, covering North and Central Wales.

Member clubs for the 2022–23 season

Champions

 2019-20: Prestatyn Town
 2020-21: Competition cancelled
 2021-22: Airbus UK Broughton

Promoted to Cymru Premier

 2019-20: Flint Town (runners-up)
 2020-21: Competition cancelled
 2021-22: Airbus UK Broughton

Relegated into Cymru North from Cymru Premier

 2019-20: Airbus UK Broughton F.C.
 2020-21: Competition cancelled
 2021-22: Cefn Druids

Relegated from Cymru North

 2019-20: Porthmadog, Corwen and Llanfair United
 2020-21: Competition cancelled
 2021-22: Llangefni Town and Llanrhaeadr

Promoted into Cymru North

 2019-20: Llanidloes Town, Holyhead Hotspur and Holywell Town
 2020-21: Competition cancelled
 2021-22: Chirk, Mold Alexandra and Porthmadog

See also
List of association football competitions
Welsh Football League
Cymru Alliance
Cymru South
Cymru Leagues

References

External links
Official site of the JD Cymru North
SOCCERWAY (FAW Championship summary)

 
2
Sports leagues established in 2019
2019 establishments in Wales
Wales
Semi-professional sports leagues